Gareth Lee Cockerill (born in 1944) taught at Wesley Biblical Seminary from 1984 until 2017 where he held the post of Academic Dean and  Professor of Biblical Interpretation and Theology. He is also an ordained minister in the Wesleyan Church. In the past he has served as a missionary in Sierra Leone, West Africa.

Career
Cockerill was educated at Southern Wesleyan University (B.A.), Asbury Theological Seminary (M.Div.) and Union Theological Seminary (Th.M. & Ph.D.).

He has written a new volume on Hebrews in the New International Commentary on the New Testament series. Although replacing the classic commentary in that series by F. F. Bruce it has been well received by scholars and pastors alike. Other material by Cockerill include his Melchizedek without Speculation: Hebrews 7:1-25 and Genesis 14:17-24 and Guidebook for Pilgrims to the Heavenly City, Building Bridges or Syncretism: A Test Case each published in larger collections. He wrote Guidebook for Pilgrims to the Heavenly City in 2002.

Articles and book reviews has been written for the Tyndale Bulletin, Bulletin for Biblical Research, Journal of Biblical Literature, The Evangelical Quarterly, Journal of the Evangelical Theological Society, Interpretation, and Missiology. He remains interested in the book of Hebrews, revelation as doctrine, hermeneutics, cross-cultural interpretation and the relationship between the Old and New Testaments. In cross faith issues he studies the subject of Christianity and Islam.

Personal
Cockerill preaches and teaches in churches and camps. The Cockerills have three adult daughters, two sons-in-law, and four grandchildren.

Selected works

References

External links

Living people
Bible commentators

Arminian ministers
Arminian theologians
Southern Wesleyan University alumni
Asbury Theological Seminary alumni
Union Presbyterian Seminary alumni
Place of birth missing (living people)
1944 births